Barbara Noda is a third generation Japanese American poet born on January 14, 1953. She is a contributor to the renowned feminist collection, This Bridge Called My Back.  She wrote the passage in section four of This Bridge Called My Back entitled Lowriding Through the Women's Movement. In 1979, she published a collection of poems entitled Strawberries that was published by Shameless Hussy Press. Noda draws upon her experience as a Japanese American Lesbian and Feminism.  These are Noda's only two publications, however today she advocates for LGBT rights in the San Francisco Bay Area.

References

1953 births
Living people
20th-century American poets
American poets of Asian descent
American women poets
Poets from California
American lesbian writers
LGBT people from the San Francisco Bay Area
American LGBT people of Asian descent
American LGBT rights activists
20th-century American women writers
21st-century American women writers